Matthew Hauser (born 3 April 1998) is an Australian triathlete. In 2021, he competed in the men's triathlon at the 2020 Summer Olympics held in Tokyo, Japan. He also competed in the mixed relay event.

In 2018, he won the gold medal in the mixed relay event at the Commonwealth Games held in Gold Coast, Australia. He also finished in 4th place in the men's triathlon. He won a bronze medal in the men's triathlon at the 2022 Commonwealth Games.

Hauser also competes in Super League Triathlon racing.

2022 season 
Hauser competed at the 2022 Birmingham Commonwealth Games where he finished third in the individual event and was also part of the Bronze medal winning Mixed Relay team, alongside Sophie Linn, Jacob Birtwistle and Natalie Van Coevorden.

At Super League Triathlon London 2022 Hauser was wrongly identified as Jamie Riddle and penalised for false starting, resulting in a time penalty. However, he was able to recover from the penalty and finish the event in 2nd place. At SLT Munich, the following week, Hauser took first place ahead of Hayden Wilde, and Vasco Vilaca, putting him in first place in the overall Championship standings heading into the 3rd event. After crashes in Malibu and Toulouse saw Hauser drop out of the top spot, he was able to take the win at the series finale in NEOM and secure second place in the series overall.

References

External links 
 

Living people
1998 births
Australian male triathletes
Commonwealth Games gold medallists for Australia
Commonwealth Games bronze medallists for Australia
Commonwealth Games medallists in triathlon
Triathletes at the 2018 Commonwealth Games
Triathletes at the 2022 Commonwealth Games
Triathletes at the 2020 Summer Olympics
Olympic triathletes of Australia
Sportsmen from Queensland
People from Maryborough, Queensland
21st-century Australian people
Medallists at the 2018 Commonwealth Games
Medallists at the 2022 Commonwealth Games